Niyati Fatnani (born 11 January 1991) is an Indian actress who work in Hindi television. She made her acting debut in 2016 with D4-Get Up and Dance, portraying Niharika Sinha. Fatnani is best known for her portrayal of Piya Rathod in Nazar and Ginni Garewal Singh in Channa Mereya.

Early life 
She was born on 11 January 1991 in Rajkot, Gujarat, India. She completed her early education at Amar Jyoti Saraswati International School located in Bhavnagar, Gujarat. She is also a professional Kathak dancer.

Career
Fatnani made her acting debut in 2016 with D4 - Get Up and Dance where she played Niharika "Baby" Sinha alongside Utkarsh Gupta. In 2017, she portrayed Dharmavidya Raidhan Katara / Arundhati / Mukhiyani in Yeh Moh Moh Ke Dhaagey alongside Eijaz Khan. From 2018 to 2020, Fatnani portrayed Piya Sharma Rathod in Nazar opposite Harsh Rajput which proved as a major turning point in her career. She also played Piya in the telefilm Ankahee Dastaan in 2021. In 2022, Fatnani portrayed Ginni Grewal in Channa Mereya opposite Karan Wahi.

Filmography

Television

Web series

Music videos

Awards and nominations

See also
 List of Hindi television actresses
 List of Indian television actresses

References

External links 

 
 
 

Living people
1991 births
Indian television actresses